The Expendables (released in the Philippines as Full Battle Gear) is a 1988 Filipino-American action film directed by Cirio H. Santiago and written by Philip Alderton. It stars Anthony Finetti, Peter Nelson, Loren Haynes and Kevin Duffis.

Plot
The film is a Vietnam exploitation film where a commando makes an elite team out of rebels. The men are trouble makers and rebels, but are able to perform well. The men are sent out to blow up a bridge and manage to destroy the North Vietnamese Army (NVA) guards. However, another NVA force arrives and an all out battle commences. During the battle, two of the men are killed, but the team kills off all of the NVA reinforcements and captures their leader.

The team is next sent on another mission to capture two village women, and then another to destroy an enemy base where another member is killed. They kill all of the NVA forces in the base, but their mission gets tougher when a prisoner escapes and captures American women and holds them hostage. The NVA splits up into two forces: one at an old fort and the other to ambush the team as it arrives.

Despite the NVA plan of ambush, the NVA are wiped out, but they manage to kill two of the women and one of the special squad. Realizing that there is little time, the squad goes on with their mission and finds the fort. Their squad leader goes inside the fort to recon and is captured. The squad decides to go in and rescue him, the POW girls, and kill the NVA leader.

Cast
 Anthony Finetti as Captain Rosello
 Peter Nelson as Sterling 
 Loren Haynes as Lord
 Kevin Duffis as Jackson
 William Steis as Colonel 
 Vic Diaz as Tranh Um Phu
 Lea Navarro as Phu Ling
 David Light as Cabrini
 Jeff Griffith as Richter
 Eric Hahn as Navarro
 Don "The Dragon" Wilson as Wilson
 Jim Moss as Moss
 Don Holtz as Holtz
 Greg Rocero as Lopez
 Corwin Sperry as Strzalkowski
 Janet Price as Nurse
 Vicky Suba as Prostitute (uncredited)

Release
The Expendables was released as Full Battle Gear by Jadestar Films in the Philippines on March 30, 1988.

Reception
From contemporary reviews, "Lor." of Variety referred to the film as "well-made but ho-hum Vietnam War saga" and that the film "is enjoyable on a mindless action level, but bogs down in some rather pretentious verbal exchanges as Philip Alderton's script tries lamely for significance." as well as noting that the "Glum ending is overly downbeat".

References

Sources

External links

1988 action films
Films shot in the Philippines
Philippine action films
Vietnam War films
Premiere Productions films
1980s English-language films
American action films
Films directed by Cirio H. Santiago
1980s American films